The Hockomock League is an interscholastic high school athletic league located in Southeastern Massachusetts, founded in 1932. The league took its name from a historic, freshwater swamp which served as a fortress for the Wampanoag native tribe during the King Philip’s War. The Wampanoags revered the area, naming it, “Hockomock,” an Algonquin word meaning, “Place where spirits dwell.” Today, the Hockomock Swamp is a protected environmental area and many local businesses, agencies and organizations use the Hockomock moniker to refer to their association with this region.

The league consists of 12 schools located in contiguous communities. All Hockomock League schools are public secondary schools and are members of the Massachusetts Interscholastic Athletic Association (MIAA). The director of the league rotates, with the athletic director of a different member school serving in the role each year.

For much of its existence, the League was made-up of nine schools but has twice undergone expansion adding a tenth school, Attleboro, in 2010, and then Taunton and Milford joined the League at the beginning of the 2012-2013 academic year.   Enrollment disparities and the desire to balance the competitiveness of its sports programs, especially football, were major reasons to expand. With the addition of more teams, in 2010 the league implemented a divisional system. Schools with larger enrollments were placed in the Kelley-Rex Division, while smaller schools are in the Davenport Division. Realignment of the divisions occurs every two years at a meeting of the school principals and athletic directors where each school reports their respective Department of Elementary and Secondary Education enrollment numbers for grades nine through eleven. Each division has six teams. Under the division format, both the Kelley-Rex and Davenport winners are considered Hockomock League champions.

In July 2019 the Hockomock League published a new logo embodying what it calls “the key components of the League’s long historical tradition and modern core values,” according to a press release.

The division names give tribute to three long-time Hockomock League administrators: Bill Rex, Foxborough High School; Louis Kelley, North Attleboro High School; and Dudley Davenport, Sharon High School. 

Since its inception, the league has earned a reputation for its competitiveness in all sports and its member schools have produced numerous sectional and state champions.

Member schools 

Note:  Enrollment figures (2021-2022) are for grades nine through eleven and are used for determining a school's divisional alignment.

Hall of Fame Coaches 
The following Hockomock League coaches have distinguished themselves in their coaching profession and have been inducted into one or more of the following Coaches Hall of Fame for their sport(s).  Organizations include Massachusetts Basketball Coaches Assn. (MBCA), Massachusetts High School Football Coaches Assn. (MHSFCA), Massachusetts Baseball Coaches Assn. (MassBCA), Eastern Massachusetts Soccer Coaches Assn (EMSCA)., Massachusetts State Track Coaches Assn. (MSTCA)

Attleborough HS
Howard Tozier, Attleboro, basketball. Inducted in 1969.
James Cassidy, Attleboro, football. Inducted in 1978.
Steve Newman, Attleboro, track. Inducted in 1998.

Canton HS

Bill Donovan, Canton, football. Inducted in 1965.
Danny Erickson, Canton, soccer. Inducted in 2013.
Robert C. Gibson, Canton, baseball. Inducted in 1978.
George King, Canton, track. Inducted in 2000.
Charlie Stevenson, Canton, football. Inducted in 2014.
Paul F. Therrien, Canton, football. Inducted in 1993.

Foxborough HS
William Rex, Foxboro, football. Inducted in 2001.
Tom Sullivan, Foxboro, football. Inducted in 1994.
Greg McManus, Foxboro, soccer. Inducted in 2003.
Jack Martinelli, Foxboro, football. Inducted in 2011.
Kevin Murphy, Foxboro, track. Inducted in 2006.

Franklin HS
Ronald Bonollo, Franklin, baseball. Inducted in 1986.
Fran Bositis, Franklin, soccer, Inducted in 2003.
Don Delloroco, Franklin, football. Inducted in 2009.
Gerard Leone, Franklin, football. Inducted in 1991.
Nello Luccini, Franklin, baseball. Inducted in 1999.
Pete Pasquarosa, Franklin, baseball. Inducted in 2013.
Paul Trovoto, Franklin, track. Inducted in 2009.

King Philip Regional HS

Gary Lombard, King Philip, baseball. Inducted in 1997.

Mansfield HS

Julie Collins, Mansfield, track, Inducted in 2013.
Mike Redding, Mansfield, football. Inducted in 2019.

Milford HS

Charles Espanet, Milford, baseball. Inducted in 1972.
Charlie Stand, Milford, baseball. Inducted in 2006.

North Attleborough HS
Ray Beaupre, North Attleboro, football. Inducted in 2000.
Dwight Estey, North Attleboro, track. Inducted in 2009.

Oliver Ames HS
Elaine Clement-Holbrook, Oliver Ames, basketball. Inducted in 2008.
Leo Duggan, Oliver Ames, baseball. Inducted in 2012.
James Mitchell, Oliver Ames, football. Inducted in 2001. 
Valentine P. Muscato, Oliver Ames, football, basketball and track. Inducted in 1979, 1976 and 1992, respectively.
William Nixon, Oliver Ames, basketball. Inducted in 2001.

Sharon HS

Dudley Davenport, Sharon, basketball. Inducted in 1989
Alan Howie, Sharon, soccer. Inducted in 2010. 
Joel Peckman, Sharon, baseball. Inducted in 2012

Stoughton HS

Robert Ashley, Stoughton, baseball. Inducted in 2001
Greg Burke, Stoughton, football. Inducted in 2019
Albert Toomey, Stoughton, football. Inducted in 1976

Notable Hockomock Athletes
The following athletes went on to have a significant collegiate or professional career:

Jim Craig - Oliver Ames (Hockey). Goalie on the 1980 US Olympic Hockey Team. Won a gold medal. Played hockey for Boston University and professionally in the NHL for the Atlanta Flames, Boston Bruins and the Minnesota North Stars.

Anthony Sherman - North Attleboro (Football). Was the team captain in football, track and baseball. Played football for the University of Connecticut. Ten-year professional football career in the NFL with the Arizona Cardinals and the Kansas City Chiefs.

Sarah Behn - Foxboro (girls basketball). She was the head women's basketball coach at Framingham State, Franklin Pierce, and Brown University. She returned to coach girls' basketball at Foxboro briefly, from 2004-2011.

External links

Teams and sports
North Attleboro Wrestling
Sharon Athletics
Franklin track and field and cross-country
Mansfield track and field and cross-country
North Attleboro track and field and cross-country
Sharon track and field and cross-country
Stoughton High School Football History
King Philip Track & Field and Cross-Country

Schools
Attleboro High School
Canton High School
Foxborough High School
Franklin High School
King Philip High School
Mansfield High School
Milford High School
North Attleboro High School
Oliver Ames High School
Sharon High School
Stoughton High School
Taunton High School
Hockomock League Website maintained by John Leahy
Hockomock Sports

References

 
Massachusetts Interscholastic Athletic Association leagues